The M.P.M. was an automobile built in Mount Pleasant, Michigan by the Mount Pleasant Motor Company from 1914 to 1915.

History 
The M.P.M. was a medium-sized conventional car equipped with either a four-cylinder or eight-cylinder engine.  After building 10 cars, financing could not be raised to continue production.

The company had plans to move its manufacturing plant to either Alma or Saginaw at the end of 1915, but the company closed before that happened.

References

Defunct motor vehicle manufacturers of the United States
Motor vehicle manufacturers based in Michigan
Defunct manufacturing companies based in Michigan

Brass Era vehicles
1910s cars
Cars introduced in 1914
Vehicle manufacturing companies established in 1914
Vehicle manufacturing companies disestablished in 1915